Nataliya Sverchikova (born 6 June 1974) is a Ukrainian short track speed skater. She competed in two events at the 1998 Winter Olympics.

References

1974 births
Living people
Ukrainian female short track speed skaters
Olympic short track speed skaters of Ukraine
Short track speed skaters at the 1998 Winter Olympics
Sportspeople from Kyiv